Pseudoliotina stinnesbecki is an extinct species of sea snail, a marine gastropod mollusk, in the family Skeneidae.

References

Skeneidae